Hombach may refer to:

Bodo Hombach (born 1952), German politician, member of the SPD
Hombach (Ochtum), a river of Lower Saxony, Germany, tributary of the Ochtum
Hombach (Westerbach), a river of Bavaria, Germany, tributary of the Westerbach
Schmelzbach, other name Hombach, a river of North Rhine-Westphalia, Germany, tributary of the Sieg